is a railway station in the town of Mitane, Yamamoto District, Akita Prefecture, Japan, operated by East Japan Railway Company (JR East).

Lines
Koikawa Station is served by the Ōu Main Line, and is located 333.0 km from the terminus of the line at Fukushima Station.

Station layout
Moritake Station consists of two opposed side platforms connected by a footbridge. The station is unattended.

Platforms

History
It has been unattended since October 1971. The station was absorbed into the JR East network upon the privatization of the JNR on April 1, 1987. A new station building was completed in July 2007.

Surrounding area

See also
 List of railway stations in Japan

External links

  

Railway stations in Japan opened in 1950
Railway stations in Akita Prefecture
Ōu Main Line
Mitane, Akita